Yeşilyurt is a village in the Tut District, Adıyaman Province, Turkey. Its population is 202 (2021).

The hamlet of Pınarlı is attached to the village.

References

Villages in Tut District